Meikle Wind Farm is a wind farm located in the Peace River region of British Columbia, Canada, between Chetwynd and Tumbler Ridge. The wind farm produces 184.6 MW of electricity and is the largest wind farm in British Columbia. It is co-owned by Pattern Energy and the Public Sector Pension Investment Board.

See also
 List of wind farms in Canada
 Gwillim Lake Provincial Park - a nearby provincial park

References

Wind farms in British Columbia